Paratorna is a genus of moths belonging to the subfamily Tortricinae of the family Tortricidae. The genus was erected by Edward Meyrick in 1907.

Species
Paratorna catenulella (Christoph, 1882)
Paratorna cuprescens Falkovitsh, 1965
Paratorna dorcas Meyrick, 1907
Paratorna fenestralis Razowski, 1964
Paratorna pterofulva Liu & Bai, 1988
Paratorna pteropolia Liu & Bai, 1988
Paratorna schintlmeisteri Razowski, 1991
Paratorna seriepuncta (Christoph, 1882)

Former species
Paratorna oenina Diakonoff, 1976

See also
List of Tortricidae genera

References

 , 2005: World Catalogue of Insects vol. 5 Tortricidae.
 , 1907, Journal of the Bombay Natural History Society 17: 980.

External links
Tortricid.net

Tortricini
Tortricidae genera